José Tiago Nunes Silva (born 26 February 1991 in Caniçal, Machico, Madeira) is a Portuguese footballer who plays for Machico as a  right back.

References

External links

Portuguese League profile 

1991 births
Living people
Portuguese footballers
Madeiran footballers
Association football defenders
Primeira Liga players
Liga Portugal 2 players
Segunda Divisão players
C.S. Marítimo players
People from Machico, Madeira